Robert Lodowick Stanton D.D. (March 28, 1810 – May 23, 1885) was an American Presbyterian minister, educator and college administrator. He served as president of Miami University of Ohio from 1868 to 1871. He also served as president of Oakland College in Mississippi.

Early life
Robert Lodowick Stanton was born on March 28, 1810, in Preston, Connecticut, the son of Joseph Stanton (1780–1828) and Susan M. (née Brewster) Stanton (1781–1853). His father manufactured woolen goods and traded with the West Indies. Robert's older brother was Henry Brewster Stanton, who became a journalist and abolitionist, publishing widely in New York and abolitionist newspapers, and lecturing on the abolitionist circuit.  Henry married Elizabeth Cady, who became a leader on issues of temperance, women's rights and suffrage, as well as abolition.

Robert Stanton studied at the Oneida Institute in Whitesboro, New York, which he left with the so-called Lane Rebels for the Lane Theological Seminary in Cincinnati, Ohio, from which he graduated. He earned his D.D. degree from Princeton University.

Career
He was ordained in 1839 by the Mississippi Presbytery, and became the pastor of churches in Mississippi, Louisiana, and Ohio. He served as the second president of Oakland College, near Rodney, Mississippi, from 1851 to 1854; it was affiliated with the Presbyterian Church.

He was Professor of Theology at Danville Theological Seminary in Kentucky from 1862 to 1866. From 1866 until 1871, he served as president of Miami University of Ohio.  He was moderator of the general assembly of the Presbyterian Church from 1866 to 1867.

Death
Stanton, who was a widower with one son, died aboard the steamship Nevada en route to London and was buried at sea on May 28, 1885, at the age of seventy-five.  At the time of his death, his residence was 2727 N Street Northwest, Washington, D.C.

Legacy
Stanton Hall on the Miami University campus is named in his honor.

References
Notes

Sources

1810 births
1885 deaths
Presidents of Miami University
Presbyterian Church in the United States of America ministers
Louisville Presbyterian Theological Seminary faculty
People who died at sea
Burials at sea
Lane Theological Seminary alumni
Oneida Institute alumni
Lane Rebels
American abolitionists
Presbyterian abolitionists
19th-century American clergy
People from Preston, Connecticut
Princeton University alumni
Religious leaders from Washington, D.C.